John Langhorne may refer to:
 John Langhorne (poet) (1735–1779), English poet and prebendary
 John Langhorne (King's School Rochester) (1836–1911), master of Tonbridge School, headmaster of The King's School, Rochester and vicar of Lamberhurst
 John Bailey Langhorne (1816–1877), solicitor and proprietor of the Newcastle Chronicle